George Provopoulos (born April 20, 1950 in Piraeus, Greece) was the Governor of the Bank of Greece from 2008 to 2014, and was a member of the European Central Bank's Governing Council. Prior to his appointment as Central Bank Head, he was a professor at the University of Athens.

Early life and education
Provopoulos obtained his Bachelor's Degree in Economics at the University of Athens, and his MA and PhD in Economics at the University of Essex on a UK Government Scholarship.

Career
Early in his career, Provopoulos was chairman and CEO at Emporiki Bank, Greece's fifth-largest lender, where he oversaw the bank's acquisition to Credit Agricole in 2006. He later served as CEO at Piraeus Bank.

As the country's central bank chief during the height of the financial crisis, Provopoulos presided over efforts to avert the collapse of Greece's banking system amid fears the country would crash out of the euro.

References

1950 births
Living people
Governors of the Bank of Greece
Academic staff of the National and Kapodistrian University of Athens
Greek bankers
People from Piraeus
National and Kapodistrian University of Athens alumni